Jafarabad-e Baqeraf (also Romanized as Ja‘farābād-e Bāqerāf; also known as Ja‘farābād-e Bāqerāt) is a village in Aftab Rural District, Aftab District, Tehran County, Tehran Province, Iran. At the 2006 census, its population was 518, in 109 families.

References 

Populated places in Tehran County